Jorum Glacier is a glacier draining the southeast slopes of Forbidden Plateau, and lowing east into Exasperation Inlet, just north of Caution Point, on the east coast of Graham Land, Antarctica. It was surveyed by the Falkland Islands Dependencies Survey in 1947 and 1955. The UK Antarctic Place-Names Committee name alludes to the punchbowl shape of the head of the glacier, a "jorum" being a large drinking bowl used for punch.

Further reading 
 Jane G. Ferrigno, Kevin M. Foley, Charles Swithinbank, and Richard S. Williams, Jr., 20 Coastal-Change and Glaciological Map of the Ross Island Area, Antarctica: 1962–2005, U.S. Geological Survey Professional Paper
 Peter A. Tuckett, Jeremy C. Ely, Andrew J. Sole, Stephen J. Livingstone, Benjamin J. Davison, J. Melchior van Wessem, & Joshua Howard, Rapid accelerations of Antarctic Peninsula outlet glaciers driven by surface melt, NATURE COMMUNICATIONS | (2019) 10:4311 | https://doi.org/10.1038/s41467-019-12039-2 
 B. Osmanoglu, F. J. Navarro, R. Hock, M. Braun, and M. I. Corcuera, Surface velocity and mass balance of Livingston Island ice cap, Antarctica, The Cryosphere, vol. 8, no. 5, 2014. doi:10.5194/tc-8-1807-2014

External links 

 Jorum Glacier on USGS website
 Jorum Glacier on AADC website
 Jorum Glacier on SCAR website

References 

Glaciers of Oscar II Coast